{{Infobox person
| name        = Constance Howard
| image       = Hold That Lion lobby card 2.jpg
| alt         = 
| caption     = Lobby card for Hold That Lion (1926)
| birth_name  = 
| birth_date  = 
| birth_place = Omaha, Nebraska
| death_date  = 
| death_place = San Diego County, California
| nationality =  
| occupation  = Film actress
}}

Constance Howard (October 4, 1906 in Omaha, Nebraska – December 7, 1980 in San Diego County, California) was an American silent film actress of the late 1920s and early 1930s.

FilmographySplendor (1935) (uncredited) as Dinner GuestThe Wedding Night (1935) (uncredited) as Party Guest
 The Poor Millionaire (1930) as Babs LongThe Smart Set (1928) as CynthiaMother Machree (1928) as Edith CuttingThe Cruel Truth (1927) as Helen SturdevantThe Night Bride (1927) as Renée StocktonWomen Love Diamonds (1927) as Dorothy Croker-KelleyThe White Black Sheep (1926) as Enid GowerHold That Lion'' (1926) as Marjorie Brand

External links

1906 births
1980 deaths
Actresses from Omaha, Nebraska
20th-century American actresses